Moussa Kalilou Djitté (born 4 October 1999) is a Senegalese professional footballer who plays as a forward for French  club Ajaccio on loan from Major League Soccer club Austin FC.

Professional career
On 21 June 2018, Djitté transferred from the Senegalese club ASC Niarry Tally to FC Sion in Switzerland. He made his professional debut in a 2–1 Swiss Super League loss to FC Lugano on 22 July 2018.

On 17 June 2019, signed with Grenoble Foot 38 in the French Ligue 2.

On 30 June 2021, he signed with Austin FC of Major League Soccer under the league's U22 Initiative. On 14th September 2022, Djitte scored the first hat trick in Austin FC history in a 3-0 victory against Real Salt Lake. Austin FC clinched their first ever playoff berth in the win.

On 31 January 2023, Djitté signed on loan with Ligue 1 side Ajaccio for the remainder of the season.

International career
Djitté represented the Senegal U20 at the 2017 Jeux de la Francophonie and scored in his side's debut. He also represented Senegal at the 2017 WAFU Cup of Nations.

On 23 March 2018, Djitté debuted for the Senegal U23 in a 1–1 friendly tie with the Morocco U23s, and scored his side's only goal.

Career statistics

Club

Personal life
Djitté is the cousin of the Senegalese footballer Souleymane Cissé.

References

External links
 
 SFL Profile
 FC Sion Profile

1999 births
Living people
Senegalese footballers
Senegal youth international footballers
Association football forwards
Grenoble Foot 38 players
FC Sion players
Austin FC players
AC Ajaccio players
Ligue 1 players
Ligue 2 players
Swiss Super League players
Major League Soccer players
Senegalese expatriate footballers
Senegalese expatriate sportspeople in Switzerland
Expatriate footballers in Switzerland
Senegalese expatriate sportspeople in France
Expatriate footballers in France